The 1993 Newbury by-election was triggered by the death of the Member of Parliament (MP) for Newbury, the Conservative Judith Chaplin. The by-election was held on 6 May 1993, and was won by David Rendel of the Liberal Democrats with a large swing of 28.4%, and well over twice as many votes as the Conservative candidate. As with the overwhelming majority of UK by-elections, turnout was lower than at the general election, falling from 83% to 71%.

Background
The by-election in Newbury was the first by-election of the 1992–1997 parliament, and the first in a string of by-election losses for the Conservative Party who were in their fourth consecutive term of office.  Until 1993 the seat had been held by a Conservative MP since 1924.

Candidates
Many independent candidates, or candidates from newly formed or minor parties stood in the by-election, with three candidates standing on an anti-Maastricht Treaty platform.  Andrew Bannon, a Labour member from Slough stood as a Conservative Candidate in protest at a Conservative member standing as a Labour Candidate in the 1992 general election in Slough.

All candidates needed since 1985 to win at least 5% of the total votes to retain their deposit, which they must pay to stand for election. Every candidate apart from David Rendel and Julian Davidson lost their deposit, including Labour's Steve Billcliffe.

The by-election achieved a record of 19 candidates, beating the previous high of seventeen at the 1984 Chesterfield by-election.  It remained the longest ballot paper in any Parliamentary election until the 2008 Haltemprice and Howden by-election.

Results

Rendel served as MP until the 2005 general election, when he was defeated by the Conservative candidate Richard Benyon.

General election result, 1992
This is the result of the 1992 general election in Newbury.

Aftermath

The loss of Newbury marked the beginning of a disastrous run of by-election defeats for John Major's Conservatives, as they went on to lose a further seven contests in seats they had held prior to the next general election in 1997. The result was later described by The Herald  as "a major embarrassment for the Major Government", while Tim Farron would remember it as being "inspirational" for the Liberal Democrats.

See also
 Lists of United Kingdom by-elections

References

 

1993 elections in the United Kingdom
1993 in England
By-election
By-elections to the Parliament of the United Kingdom in Berkshire constituencies
1990s in Berkshire